The 1942–43 Wyoming Cowboys basketball team represented the University of Wyoming in NCAA men's competition in the  NCAA college basketball season. The Cowboys won the Mountain States Conference championship and were the first basketball team from the Rocky Mountains to win an NCAA title. Kenny Sailors of Hillsdale, Wyoming averaged 15.5 points per game and Milo Komenich averaged 16.7 points per game in leading the team to the championship. Despite playing just nine home games during the year, the Cowboys won 32 games.

Roster

Regular season
In the fourth game of the season, the Cowboys lost to Duquesne. It would be the last game the Cowboys lost to a college team during the season. Their only other loss was to the Denver Legion team. The Cowboys outscored their opponents by an average of over twenty points per game and was the first Wyoming team to score over 100 points in a game, by beating Regis 101–45.

Postseason

NCAA tournament

West regional (Kansas City)
Wyoming 53, Oklahoma 50
Wyoming 58, Texas 54 (National semifinal) 
Championship (New York)
 Wyoming 46, Georgetown 34

Red Cross game
St. John's won the eight-team National Invitation Tournament the night before, also at Madison Square Garden, and claimed it was better than Wyoming and that the NIT was a better event than the eight-team NCAA tournament. Ev Shelton talked Ned Irish, the promoter at Madison Square Garden, into hosting a showdown game, with proceeds going to the Red Cross. Two days after winning the NCAA Championship at Madison Square Garden, Wyoming met St. John's in a Red Cross benefit game for the war effort, and the Cowboys won in overtime,

Awards and honors
  First team from the Rocky Mountains to win an NCAA championship
  Only Wyoming basketball team to win an NCAA championship
  Defeated NIT champion St. John's in Red Cross benefit game
 Ken Sailors, First-team All-America selection
 Ken Sailors, NCAA Men's MOP Award

References

Wyoming
Wyoming Cowboys basketball seasons
NCAA Division I men's basketball tournament championship seasons
NCAA Division I men's basketball tournament Final Four seasons
Wyoming
Wyoming Cowboys Basketball Team
Wyoming Cowboys Basketball Team